Sevim Dağdelen (born 4 September 1975) is a German politician and a member of the Left Party.

Early years
Born in Duisburg to Kurdish immigrants, Sevim Dağdelen finished high school in 1997, and studied law first at the University of Marburg and then at the University of Adelaide, Australia and later at the University of Cologne. She did not complete her law studies and dropped out to pursue her political career.

She worked as a journalist for the Turkish newspaper Evrensel and German publications Tatsachen and Junge Stimme. She was also active as a translator.

Career
After joining the Left Party, Dağdelen became a member of the regional-level party council of North Rhine-Westphalia and the  federal student agency from 1996 to 1998. From 1993 to 2001, she was a member of the federal youth commission. Since 2005, she has been a member of the German Bundestag.

Dağdelen participated in the State dinner with Angela Merkel at the White House in June 2011.

Dağdelen visited Julian Assange at the Embassy of Ecuador in the United Kingdom in September 2012, passing on to him "solidarity ... from the left in Germany and the online community in Germany".

Dağdelen was re-elected into the Bundestag for the fourth time following the 2017 election.

She is currently presiding the German-Turkish Parliamentarian group in the Bundestag. 

She is known to be a supporter of the Kurdish People's Protections Units (YPG) as she showed the flag of the YPG in the Bundestag which in Germany is forbidden. She also opposes the German foreign policy regarding Turkey, who attacked the YPG in Afrin. Her appearance at a regional IG Metall congress in 2018 lead to a controversy, as Turks made a social media campaign to end their membership in the workers union.

She was re-elected at the 2021 German federal election.

Political positions
In February 2022, Dağdelen said Russia has no interest in an invasion of Ukraine and was concerned with its legitimate security interests. She also called for a neutral status for Ukraine. On 18 February 2022, she appeared at a demonstration in Berlin with the slogan "Security for Russia is security for our country," where she accused the German media of spreading the "tall tales of the U.S. intelligence service". After the Russian invasion occurred, Dağdelen was among the co-signers of a statement attributing significant responsibility for the Russian invasion to the United States. In April 2022, she praised German protesters who opposed an increase in German military spending, and she described it as "madness" to deliver military weapons to Ukraine.

See also
Kurds in Germany

References

External links

Sevim Dağdelen Bundestag profile

1975 births
Living people
People from Duisburg
German people of Kurdish descent
German politicians of Turkish descent
Members of the Bundestag for North Rhine-Westphalia
Aufstehen
Female members of the Bundestag
21st-century German women politicians
University of Marburg alumni
Adelaide Law School alumni
University of Cologne alumni
Kurdish politicians
Members of the Bundestag 2021–2025
Members of the Bundestag 2017–2021
Members of the Bundestag 2013–2017
Members of the Bundestag 2009–2013
Members of the Bundestag 2005–2009
Members of the Bundestag for The Left
21st-century Kurdish women politicians